Callionyma is a monotypic snout moth genus. Its one species, Callionyma sarcodes, was described by Edward Meyrick in 1882. It is found in the southern half of Australia, including Tasmania.

The wingspan is about 20 mm.

The larvae feed on Eucalyptus species.

References

Moths described in 1882
Tirathabini
Moths of Australia
Monotypic moth genera
Pyralidae genera